Heitkamp is a surname. Notable people with the surname include:

Heidi Heitkamp (born 1955), American politician and US Senator from North Dakota 
Joel Heitkamp (born 1961), American politician and North Dakota state senator

See also
Heitkamp BauHolding, German construction and civil engineering company